The spotted antpitta (Hylopezus macularius) is a species of bird in the family Grallariidae. It is found in Bolivia, Brazil, Colombia, Ecuador, French Guiana, Guyana, Peru, Suriname, and Venezuela. Its natural habitat is subtropical or tropical moist lowland forest.

References

spotted antpitta
Birds of the Amazon Basin
Birds of the Guianas
spotted antpitta
Birds of Brazil
Taxonomy articles created by Polbot